The following is a list of incidents characterized as inspired by Islamophobia by commentators. Islamophobia became a popular term in ideological debate following the September 11 attacks, the 9/11 attack is a biggest reason of islamophobia and it has also been retrospectively applied to earlier incidents. Islamophobia is the fear, hatred of, or prejudice against the Islamic religion or Muslims generally, especially when seen as a geopolitical force or the source of terrorism.

Incidents and conditions

Albania
Below is a list of  incident(s) in Albania that could be considered Islamophobic:

Australia

Below is a list of  incidents in Australia that could be considered Islamophobic:

Austria
Below is a list of  incidents in Austria that could be considered Islamophobic:

Belgium

Below is a list of  incidents in Belgium that could be considered Islamophobic:

Bosnia and Herzegovina

In the 1990s, the Bosnian Genocide and the Kosovo War, both of which involved the mass murder of innocent Muslims, have been linked to Islamophobia. In Bosnia, Christian Serb and Croat militias carried out genocidal attacks on the Muslim Bosniak community. According to the ICRC data on the Bosnian Genocide, "20,000 people were killed, 12,000 of them children, up to 50,000 women were raped, and 2.2 million were forced to flee their homes."  Many attacks on religious buildings and symbols took place in towns such as Foča, where all of the town's mosques were destroyed. On 22 April 1992, Serbs blew up the Aladža Mosque and eight more mosques dating from the 16th and 17th centuries were damaged or completely destroyed.

Brazil
Below is a list of  incidents in Brazil that could be considered Islamophobic:

Bulgaria
Below is a list of  incidents in Bulgaria that could be considered Islamophobic:

Canada

In recent years, attacks against Muslims increased, mainly in the provinces of Ontario and Quebec. Until 2016 the attacks were all arson incidents, vandalism and melee attacks. However, since 2017 incidents started to be deadly and carried out with terrorist tactics, resulting in 11 deaths, of whom six in 2017, one in 2020 and four in 2021.

Below is a list of  incidents in Canada that could be considered Islamophobic:

Chad
Below is a list of  incidents in Chad that could be considered Islamophobic:

China 

Below is a list of  incidents in China that could be considered Islamophobic:

Central African Republic
Below is a list of  incidents in the Central African Republic that could be considered Islamophobic:

Denmark
Below is a list of  incidents in Denmark that could be considered Islamophobic:

France

In 2010 France banned face coverings including women wearing the niqāb. The French Collective against Islamophobia reported "an explosion" in the number of physical attacks on women wearing the niqab. Kenza Drider, a protester against the law, said: "I'm insulted about three to four times a day. Most say, 'Go home'; some say, 'We'll kill you.' One said: 'We'll do to you what we did to the Jews.'... I feel that I now know what Jewish women went through before the Nazi roundups in France. When they went out in the street they were identified, singled out, they were vilified. Now that's happening to us." After the Charlie Hebdo shooting in January 2015, there were reports of attacks on mosques and Muslim citizens throughout the country.

Below is a list of  incidents in France that could be considered Islamophobic:

Germany 

Below is a list of  incidents in Germany that could be considered Islamophobic:

Greece
Below is a list of  incidents in Greece that could be considered Islamophobic:

Iraq
Below is a list of  incidents in Iraq that could be considered Islamophobic:

Israel and Palestine

Below is a list of  incidents in Israel and Palestine that could be considered Islamophobic:

Indonesia
Under the reign of President Suharto during the New Order (Indonesia), Islamists were suppressed, and religious Muslims were actively persecuted by the Indonesian government. Several Christian Generals who served under Suharto like Leonardus Benjamin Moerdani actively persecuted religious Muslims in the Indonesian military, which was described as being "anti-Islamic", denying religious Muslims promotions, and preventing them from praying in the barracks and banning them from even using the Islamic greeting "Salaam Aleikum", and these anti-Islamic policies were entirely supported by Suharto, despite Suharto being a Muslim himself, since he considered political Islam a threat to his power. The Christian General Theo Syafei, who also served under Suharto, spoke out against political Islam coming to power in Indonesia, and insulted the Qur'an and Islam in remarks which were described as Islamophobic.

Italy

Below is a list of  incidents in Italy that could be considered Islamophobic:

India

 
Religious clashes have been intermittent in modern India, which saw its own birth being marred by the religious riots that took place during the Direct Action Day and during its partition. Since then, India has seen violent incidents involving both the majority Hindu population and the minority Muslim population in a series of communal riots, one of which was the Bhagalpur riots of 1989, which has led to the death of 900–1,000 Muslims and leaving 50,000 displaced. Recently, India has also seen tensions between Hindus and Muslims in the 2002 Gujarat violence; In response to the Godhra train burning, the nationalist party Vishva Hindu Parishad had organized protests that had immediately turned violent. After days of rioting and violence, it was estimated that 790 Muslims and 254 Hindus were killed, 2,500 injured and 223 missing.
Below is a list of incidents in India that have been considered to be Islamophobic:

Mali
Below is a list of  incidents in Mali that could be considered Islamophobic:

Myanmar 

Below is a list of  incidents in Myanmar that could be considered Islamophobic

Netherlands
Below is a list of  incidents in the Netherlands that could be considered Islamophobic:

New Zealand 
Below is a list of  incident in New Zealand that is Islamophobic:

Norway

Below is a list of  incidents in Norway that could be considered Islamophobic:

Philippines

Below is a list of  incidents in the Philippines that could be considered Islamophobic:

Poland

Below is a list of  incidents in the Poland that could be considered Islamophobic:

Romania

Below is a list of  incidents in the Romania that could be considered Islamophobic:

Russia

Due to activity of the Muslim Chechens in organised crime and terrorism many Russians (including authorities) have associated Islam and Muslims with terrorism and domestic crimes.

Below is a list of  incidents in Russia that could be considered Islamophobic:

Sri Lanka

Below is a list of  incidents in Sri Lanka that could be considered Islamophobic:

Spain
Below is a list of  incidents in Spain that could be considered Islamophobic:

Sweden
Below is a list of  incidents in Sweden that could be considered Islamophobic:

Switzerland
Below is a list of  incidents in Switzerland that could be considered Islamophobic:

Ukraine
Below is a list of  incidents in Ukraine that could be considered Islamophobic:

United Kingdom

Below is a list of  incidents in the United Kingdom that could be considered Islamophobic:

United States

In the aftermath of the Oklahoma City bombing, many residents of Middle Eastern descent and African-American Muslims became victims of the initial rage at "Muslim terrorists" as the initial news stories hypothesized. KFOR-TV's coverage of the bombing informed viewers that a member of the Nation of Islam had taken credit for the bombing. Even though the network cautioned that it might be a crank call, it repeated the claim throughout the day's coverage. According to a report prepared by the Arab American Institute, three days after the bombings, "more than 200 serious hate crimes were committed against Arab Americans and American Muslims. The same was true in the days following September 11." There were also suggestions on the radio that all Arab Americans should "be put in internment camps".

In the aftermath of the September 11 attacks, hate crimes against people of Middle-Eastern descent increased from 354 attacks in 2000 to 1,501 attacks in 2001. Among the victims of the backlash was a Middle-Eastern man in Houston, Texas who was shot and wounded after an assailant accused him of "blowing up the country" and four immigrants were shot and killed by a man named Larme Price who confessed to killing them as "revenge" for the September 11 attacks. Although Price described his victims as Arabs, only one was from an Arab country. This appears to be a trend; on account of stereotypes of Arabs, several non-Arab, non-Muslim groups were subjected to attacks in the wake of 9/11, including several Sikh men who were attacked for wearing their religiously mandated turban. According to a report prepared by the Arab American Institute, three days after the Oklahoma City bombing (which was committed by anti-government white American Timothy McVeigh), "more than 200 serious hate crimes were committed against Arab Americans and American Muslims. The same was true in the days following September 11."

While en route to Chicago, Shahrukh Khan, a well-known Bollywood actor, was held for what he described as "humiliating" questioning for several hours in Newark Airport, New Jersey because of his common Muslim surname Khan. He was released only following the intervention of the Indian embassy.

In April 2012, various media sources reported that the Joint Forces Staff College taught an anti-Islam course. The course taught that "they [Muslims] hate everything you stand for and will never coexist with you." It also proposed justified the destruction of the cities of Mecca and Medina "without regard for civilian deaths". The course was suspended after a student objected to the material.

In early August 2012 U.S. Representative Joe Walsh (R-IL) said at a town hall that radical Muslims were “trying to kill Americans every week.” Soon after his remarks several attacks against Muslims took place in his district, including a 12 August acid bomb attack on a Muslim school in Lombard, Illinois during evening Ramadan prayers and hate graffiti found on 16 August in a Muslim Cemetery. There also were several other attacks of mosques with pellet guns, acid bombs, eggs, or unclean animal parts. Some incidents are being investigated as hate crimes.

Research suggests that hate crimes and discrimination against Muslims in the United States leads to lower assimilation rates.

Below is a list of  incidents in the United States that could be considered Islamophobic:

Vietnam
The Cham Muslims in Vietnam are only recognized as a minority, and not as an indigenous people by the Vietnamese government despite being indigenous to the region. Muslim Chams have experienced violent religious and ethnic persecution and restrictions on practicing their faith under the current Vietnamese government, with the Vietnamese state confiscating Cham property and forbidding Cham from observing their religious beliefs. In 2010 and 2013 several incidents occurred in Thành Tín and Phươc Nhơn villages where Cham were murdered by Vietnamese. In 2012, Vietnamese police in Chau Giang village stormed into a Cham Mosque, stole the electric generator, and also raped Cham girls. Cham Muslims in the Mekong Delta have also been economically marginalized and pushed into poverty by Vietnamese policies, with ethnic Vietnamese Kinh settling on majority Cham land with state support, and religious practices of minorities have been targeted for elimination by the Vietnamese government.

Incidents on aircraft
After 9/11 some incidents with Muslim passengers on aircraft have given rise to the expression "Flying while Muslim".
 On 16 August 2006, British passengers on board a flight from Malaga to Manchester requested the removal of two men of Asian descent from a plane. According to a spokesman for the Civil Guard in Malaga, "These men had aroused suspicion because of their appearance and the fact that they were speaking in a foreign language thought to be an Arabic language, and the pilot was refusing to take off until they were escorted off the plane." A security sweep of the plane found no explosives or any item of a terrorist nature. Monarch Airlines booked the men, who were Urdu speakers, into a hotel room, gave them a free meal and sent them home on a later plane. The men later responded, "Just because we're Muslim, does not mean we are suicide bombers." The Islamic Human Rights Commission blamed "ever-increasing Islamophobia" related to the "war on terror" for the incident.
 A passenger traveling to the British Virgin Islands on a plane bound for the United States from Manchester in the UK was forced off the plane prior to takeoff. The man, a British-born Muslim residing in the United States, said he was singled out because he was a Muslim pilot and was left feeling "demoralized and humiliated. I must have met the profile on the day. I have an Arabic name, I am a Muslim, I'm from Britain and I know how to fly."
 On 21 November 2006, six imams were forcefully removed from a US Airways flight at Minneapolis St. Paul International Airport for security reasons. The event led to an outcry from Muslim organizations in America saying that what happened showed the growing prejudice against Muslims in America. Investigations by the airline and police so far have reported that the airline and ground crews responded to security concerns properly in removing the men from the plane. See Flying Imams controversy for more details regarding this incident.
 In 2009, AirTran Airways removed nine Muslim passengers, including three children, from a flight and turned them over to the FBI after one of the men commented to another that they were sitting right next to the engines and wondered aloud where the safest place to sit on the plane was. Although the FBI subsequently cleared the passengers and called the incident a "misunderstanding," AirTran refused to seat the passengers on another flight, forcing them to purchase last minute tickets on another airline that had been secured with the FBI's assistance. A spokesman for AirTran initially defended the airline's actions and said they would not reimburse the passengers for the cost of the new tickets. Although the men had traditional beards and the women headscarves, AirTran denied that their actions were based on the passengers' appearance. The following day, after the incident received widespread media coverage, AirTran reversed its position and issued a public apology, adding that it would in fact reimburse the passengers for the cost of their rebooked tickets.
On 18 November 2015, in two separate incidents, passengers at Midway Airport were allegedly not permitted to fly aboard Southwest Airlines flights when other passengers claimed to be afraid to fly with them because they were speaking Arabic, or appeared to be Muslim. The refusal sparked widespread condemnation on the airline's social media pages and received prominent coverage, in the US and internationally, accompanied by calls for a boycott of the airline. According to The Economist, "in the two Southwest cases, it was the passengers themselves conducting their own vigilante profiling; the airline was merely bowing to their demands."

Politician-related incidents
 CAIR and the Associated Press called United States Rep. Virgil Goode (R-VA) Islamophobic for his December 2006 letter stating that Rep-elect Keith Ellison's desire to use the Qur'an during the swearing in ceremonies was a threat to "the values and beliefs traditional to the United States of America" and for saying "I fear that in the next century we will have many more Muslims in the United States if we do not adopt the strict immigration policies."
 Concerning the US state of North Carolina's position (as expressed by their attorney general's office) in the ongoing case of ACLU of N.C. & Syidah Matteen v. State of North Carolina that the only swearing-in for testimony in court that was valid had to be on a Christian Bible (and that all others must choose to affirm), CAIR's Legal Director in Washington D.C, Arsalan Iftikhar, said “This shows there's a lot of anti-Muslim sentiment, especially here in the United States.”
British cabinet ministers had been criticized in October 2006 for helping to "unleash a public anti-Muslim backlash" in the United Kingdom by blaming the Muslim community over issues of integration despite a survey commissioned by the Home Office on 400, 15-year-old white and Asian-Muslim youths finding that Asian-Muslim youths are more tolerant and that white British youths have more intolerant attitudes.

Media-related incidents
 A 2008 amateur shoot 'em up computer game called Muslim Massacre: The Game of Modern Religious Genocide had as its aim killing all Muslims that appear on the screen. The game's creator took down the game's download site with a statement of apology on his personal website, stating his original intention in releasing the game, to "mock the foreign policy of the United States and the commonly held belief in the United States that Muslims are a hostile people to be held with suspicion." He said this had not been understood by the wider public and that its release "did not achieve its intended effect and instead only caused hurt to hospitable, innocent people." However, it later emerged that the apology was indeed fake and the original game was an act of a political statement and not of anti-Muslim sentiment.
 In September 2012 the group Stop Islamization of America, which has been labeled a "hate group" by the Southern Poverty Law Center and the Anti-Defamation League, ran advertisements in the New York City Subway reading "In any war between the civilized man and the savage, support the civilized man. Support Israel. Defeat Jihad." Several groups condemned the advertisements as "hate speech." In early January 2013 a related group put up advertisements next to 228 clocks in 39 New York subway stations showing the 2001 attacks on the World Trade Center with a quote attributed to the Koran: “Soon shall we cast terror into the hearts of the unbelievers.” The New York City Transit Authority, which said it would have to carry the advertisements on First Amendment grounds, insisted that 25% of the ad contain a Transit Authority disclaimer. These advertisements also were criticized.

See also

Hate crime
Persecution of Muslims
 Religious intolerance
 Religious persecution
 Hijabophobia

Notes

References

Sources

Further reading

External links

Hate crime
Islam-related lists
Islamophobia